The 1979 PBA Invitational Championship was the third conference of the 1979 PBA season. It started on November 20 and ended on December 15, 1979.

Toyota Tamaraws won the Invitational crown for the third straight year, defeating arch rival Crispa Walk Tall Jeans, three games to one.

Format
The following format will be observed for the duration of the tournament:
 Top four teams in the second conference are qualified in the Invitational championship. The five eliminated ballclubs in the second conference earlier played in a single round robin to determined the other two qualifiers. 
 The top two teams at the end of the single round eliminations advance to the best-of-five finals. The third and fourth-place finishers play in the best-of-five series for third place.

Elimination round

Battle for third

Finals

Fortunato Co shot 22 points and Abet Guidaben added 10 as half of the players fielded by Crispa coach Baby Dalupan hit in double figures. Philip Cezar also starred with 18 points for the Jeansmakers, nine in the second quarter as Walk Tall took the half by 11 points, 58-47.

Walk Tall Jeans faced an intact Toyota lineup by virtue of a management decision to reactivate three players suspended at the start of the third conference by coach Dante Silverio. Ramon Fernandez, Abe King and Estoy Estrada reported for their first game but the Tamaraws found themselves without a coach as Dante Silverio resigned earlier in the day as both manager and coach.

Crispa played with only one import as Irvin Chatman was in sick bay. Toyota led by 10 points, 36-26 at the end of the first quarter. The Tamaraws went full steam in the second quarter and posted a 22-point lead at the half. With Andy Fields and Bruce King running rings around the lone Walk Tall Jeans import Bernard Harris, the Tamaraws upped their lead to 27 at the close of the third quarter, 94-67. Early in the fourth, Crispa coach Baby Dalupan went All-Filipino to signify he was throwing in the towel. With still 6:30 to go, Toyota held its biggest lead in the game at 37 points, 107-70. 

The Tamaraws outscored the Jeansmakers, 31-20, in the second quarter for a 52-42 halftime lead from which Crispa never recovered. The defending champions went on to post their biggest lead, 82-63,and then held off a rally by the Jeansmakers in the closing minutes.

Robert Jaworski lobbed in seven straight points as Toyota tried to breakaway, 83-75, midway in the final quarter. The Tamaraws were up by four points when Andrew Fields capped a 9-4 binge with a towering dunkshot that took out the pressure, 94-85, with 1:54 to go.

References

PBA Invitational Championship
Invitational Championship